Fabiola Beracasa Beckman is a film and television producer, philanthropist and socialite. She was born in Caracas, Venezuela. Beracasa Beckman is co-owner of The Hole Gallery, an art gallery in New York City.

Early life and education
Beracasa Beckman was born Maria Fabiola Beracasa in Caracas, Venezuela. Her father is Alfredo Beracasa, a Venezuelan banker and industrialist. Her mother, Veronica Hearst, married Randolph Apperson Hearst in 1987. Beracasa Beckman attended the Chateau Mont-Choisi boarding school in Lausanne, Switzerland, and later attended Boston College. Beracasa Beckman was creative director for Circa, a company that places fine and antique jewelry with dealers and private collectors around the world, until 2008. She is co-owner and creative director at The Hole Gallery in New York City.

Career
While attending school, Beracasa Beckman had a summer internship spanning 4 years at Chanel’s Paris studio. She worked at the New York office of Christian Dior overseeing special events.

Beracasa Beckman is producer of "Desert Dancer," a film about an Iranian dancer who strived to reach his dream despite dance being forbidden in Iran. She also produces The Grant, a TV show where social entrepreneurs compete for funding. Beracasa Beckman founded Planted Projects, a production company, in 2015.

In addition to her work as a producer, Beracasa Beckman was a contributing editor for ELLE, and is currently a contributing editor Interview Magazine.

She is a board member of the Art Production Fund, and an adviser for the New York Academy of Arts.

Beracasa Beckman produced the film, The First Monday in May, a documentary about the 2015 Metropolitan Museum of Art's gala and spring exhibition, China: Through the Looking Glass. The film opened the 2016 Tribeca Film Festival.

Philanthropy
Beracasa Beckman is an Education Ambassador for More Than Me, an all-girls school in Liberia which supports vulnerable and at risk children. She is a member of Friends of Finn, an organization which spreads awareness about puppy mills.

Snap-X, which stands for spay, neuter, adopt, and protect, is a Petfinder Foundation charity which Beracasa Beckman operates and founded.

Personal life
Beracasa Beckman lives in New York with her husband Jason Beckman, the founder of Colbeck Capital Management  whom she married in June 2014, and their two sons, Julien Alfredo and Felix Sidney, and daughter Paloma.

References

Boston College alumni
Venezuelan businesspeople
Venezuelan film producers
Living people
Venezuelan television producers
Year of birth missing (living people)